Louis Edmond Menze (June 28, 1894 – October 7, 1982) was a college men's basketball coach and athletics administrator. He was the head coach of Iowa State from 1928 to 1947. He coached Iowa State to a 166–153 record, winning four Big Six Conference championships and made the 1944 Final Four in one NCAA tournament appearance.  He also served as Iowa State's athletic director from 1945 to 1958.  He was inducted into the Iowa State athletics Hall of Fame in 1998.

Head coaching record

See also
 List of NCAA Division I Men's Final Four appearances by coach

References

1894 births
1982 deaths
American men's basketball coaches
Basketball coaches from Nebraska
Iowa State Cyclones men's basketball coaches
Iowa State Cyclones athletic directors